Nan Bosler  is an Australian community activist and advocate for young people, the elderly and people with disabilities. She is an author and most notable internationally for her involvement with computer clubs and digital skills for older people. Bosler was associated with Girl Guides for more than 50 years in a variety of roles.

Early years
Nancy Bosler was born in Strathfield on 24 January 1935.

Education
Bosler attended North Sydney Girls High School. Bosler attended university as a mature aged student aged over 50 and was successful in achieving a Diploma of Education (Adult Community Education) (1989); Diploma of Community Organisations (1990); Graduate Diploma Local and Applied History (1991 UNE) Bachelor of Education (Adult Education) (1993) and a Master of Local Government (1996) Diploma of Family History (2018 UTAS).

Career and advocacy work
Bosler was instrumental in establishing long-running holiday programs for handicapped children in Sydney's northern beaches.

In 1997 Bosler founded the Australia Seniors Computer Clubs Association (ASCCA). She has represented ASCCA nationally and internationally and has been a member of the Cyber Security Awareness Week Committee, Broadband for Seniors Kiosk Consortium, Ambassador for Seniors Week (2013-2015), a member of the New South Wales Carers Advisory Council (2010-2014) and a National Cyber Security Awareness Ambassador, 2013.

Bosler was associated with the Girl Guides in many different roles for more than 50 years including serving as Assistant Region Commissioner, Division Commissioner, District Commissioner, Commissioner Trainer, Committee Member and Brownie Guider.

In 2019, Bosler was awarded a Member (AM) of the Order of Australia for significant service to seniors and to the community.

Works

Awards
 2019: Member (AM) of the Order of Australia for significant service to seniors and to the community
 2017: Not-for-Profit Technology Lifetime Service Award
 2013: Broadband Champion 2013, Minister for Broadband Communications and Digital Divide
 2007: Adult Learning Australia Ambassador Award
 2001: Centenary Medal, for 'service to the seniors community, including helping seniors to use information technology'
 2001: Hall of Fame, North Sydney Girls High School
 1999: Premier's Seniors Achievement Award
 1992: Medal of the Order of Australia ‘In recognition of service to the community, particularly youth, aged people and to people with disabilities'.

References

1935 births
Living people
Writers from Sydney
20th-century Australian women writers
20th-century Australian writers
Members of the Order of Australia
Recipients of the Medal of the Order of Australia
Recipients of the Centenary Medal